The Naranjo Museum of Natural History is a museum located in Lufkin, Texas.

Background
The museum was founded by Neal Naranjo, a doctor of neuropsychology. Naranjo has been a collector of fossils from a young age, and in 2006 he began showing his large collection of fossils to students in the Lufkin area and in 2012 they established a permanent, ten thousand square foot location. The museum, which drew one hundred thousand visitors in its first full year of operation, serves as a permanent location to display his collection, the highlight of which is a hadrosaur.

The artifacts range from pre-historic to modern and include five dinosaur eggs thought to be more than sixty million years old as well as a replica T-Rex sourced from the Hell Creek Formation that the museum named Bubba Rex. It is the only tyrannosaurus in East Texas.

References

External links

Tourist attractions in Angelina County, Texas
Natural history museums in Texas